Mark Francis Mullins (born 15 November 1966) is an English surgeon and former first-class cricketer.

Mullins was born at Gravesend in November 1966 and later studied at Homerton College at the University of Cambridge. While studying at Cambridge, he played first-class cricket for Cambridge University Cricket Club in 1989, making six appearances. Playing as a medium pace bowler in the Cambridge side, he took 10 wickets at average of 43.80; half of these wickets came in a single innings against Glamorgan on his first-class debut.

After training at St Mary's Hospital in London, Mullins became a specialist orthopaedic surgeon.

References

External links

1966 births
Living people
People from Gravesend, Kent
Alumni of Homerton College, Cambridge
English cricketers
Cambridge University cricketers
20th-century English medical doctors
English surgeons
21st-century English medical doctors